Sygard Grytting is an historic farm at Sør-Fron in the traditional region of Gudbrandsdal, Norway.
Agriculture specializes in sheep, grain, grass production and forestry.
The main farm houses date from the period between 1650 and 1860.

The farm also has a long guest tradition. 
The former worker's lodge offers twelve guest rooms.
From 1917 to 1958, there was a boarding house in the lower main building, which today operates as  a historic hotel.

References

External links
Sygard Grytting website

Gudbrandsdalen
Hotels in Norway
Historic farms in Norway